Alexander Eiban (born 5 May 1994) is a German association football goalkeeper.

Honours
1. FC Schweinfurt 05
 Bavarian Cup: 2017–18

References

External links

1994 births
Living people
German footballers
SV Wacker Burghausen players
1. FC Schweinfurt 05 players
Sportfreunde Lotte players
FC Pipinsried players
3. Liga players
Regionalliga players
Association football goalkeepers